Soft Em (Ꙧ ꙧ; italics: Ꙧ ꙧ ) is a letter of the Cyrillic script.
Soft Em is used in the Old Church Slavonic language.

The font DejaVu has the glyph in Cyrillic Extended-B.

Computing codes

See also
Cyrillic characters in Unicode